King's Hall was once one of the constituent colleges of Cambridge, founded in 1317, the second after Peterhouse. King's Hall was established by King Edward II to provide chancery clerks for his administration, and was very rich compared to Michaelhouse, which occupied the southern area of what is now Trinity Great Court.

History

Alan Cobban has identified John Hotham, Bishop of Ely, as the person who guided Edward II in this foundation.  It received letters patent from Edward III in 1337.  In 1412, the master or warden is recorded as Richard Derham.  In 1433, Richard Pyghtesley was described as a clerk, in King's Hall, (Aula Regis). 

King's Hall no longer exists, as it was combined with Michaelhouse in the mid 16th century by King Henry VIII, as one of his last acts. At the time, the King had been wiping out and seizing Church lands from abbeys and monasteries. It is thought that the King had great plans to create a college to rival Oxford's Christ Church with great new architecture, but he died a few weeks after the college was created. The layout of Great Court is mainly due to Thomas Nevile, a master of Trinity. The universities of Oxford and Cambridge, being both religious institutions and quite rich, expected to be the next target, and, indeed, the King duly passed an Act of Parliament that allowed him to suppress (and confiscate the property of) any college he wished.

The universities of Oxford and Cambridge remained dominated by Anglican clergy until well into the 19th century - this was one of the driving aspects for the setting up of secular institutions, e.g. University College, London to cater for dissenters.

The universities used their contacts to plead with Henry VIII's 6th wife, Catherine Parr. The Queen persuaded her husband not to close them down, but to create a new college. The King did not want to use royal funds, so he instead combined the two colleges of King's Hall and Michaelhouse and seven hostels of Catherine's, Garratt, Gregory's, Margaret's, Ovyng's, Physwick (formerly part of Gonville and Caius) and Tyler's to form Trinity in 1546. This, combined with lands confiscated from the Church, caused Trinity to be the richest and biggest college, a position it has retained.

Location

King's Hall was located in what is now the northern section of the Great Court of Trinity College, and there still stands an original building from that time. It is found off Great Court next to the Chapel, and contains some of the most coveted rooms in the College, generally held only by long-standing fellows of great academic merit, staircases C and D Great Court. The Clock Tower was from King's Hall but was moved from where the sundial now is, and the Great Gate of Trinity was built just before the amalgamation and thus still bears the King's Hall name, in Latin. Unfortunately, the last buildings of Michaelhouse were recorded as being knocked down with the completion of the southern section of Great Court.

Notes
 This article derives some information from an edition of Trinity College - An Historical Sketch by GM Trevelyan, along with information from various individuals associated with the College and the University.
In Geoffrey Chaucer's The Canterbury Tales, The Reeve's Tale tells of two students from "Soler Halle" (another name for King's Hall), who take their revenge on a thieving miller and his family for stealing grain from the University.

References

External links
A photo of King's Hall
Trinity College Official Site
University of Cambridge Official Site

Former colleges of the University of Cambridge
Trinity College, Cambridge
1317 establishments in England
1546 disestablishments
Educational institutions established in the 14th century